Sakhteman-e Baseri (also Romanized as Sākhtemān-e Bāşerī) is a village in Abarj Rural District, Dorudzan District, Marvdasht County, Fars Province, Iran. At the 2006 census, its population was 49, in 9 families.

References 

Populated places in Marvdasht County